Krazy George Henderson (born May 6, 1944) is an American professional cheerleader who created the Wave in 1979.

Career
Henderson began cheerleading while a student at California State University, San Jose in 1968, where he was also a member of the National Championship judo team.  After graduating, he continued cheerleading for free at local sporting events, where he became known for leading sectional cheers, accompanied by his hand drum.  In the early 1970s, while working as a high school teacher at Buchser High School in Santa Clara, California, Henderson was hired by the California Golden Seals of the National Hockey League to be a cheerleader. At one game in 1974 between the Seals and Boston Bruins, his antics attracted the attention of a PR executive from a new soccer franchise in San Jose who was attending the Seals game.

The San Jose Earthquakes invited him to join the soccer club for its inaugural season for $35 per game. Fans, averaging over 15,000 per game, reacted so boisterously to his cheerleading that a formal protest was filed by one opponent after a loss, claiming that the crowd noise 'interfered with (the) team's preparations for overtime.' Eventually the Quakes' Communications Director Tom Mertens and Krazy George came to an understanding to slightly tone down his antics, but crowds still reacted wildly to cheers until he left the Quakes in 1978. The Quakes had essentially launched his full-time career. In 1975 he was hired to be a cheerleader for one game by the NFL Kansas City Chiefs team owner Lamar Hunt. Hunt had witnessed Henderson during an Earthquakes soccer game against the Dallas Tornado, which Hunt also owned.  Hunt then extended his contract for the remainder of the season, and each year through 1979 (when the Chiefs lost a bidding war to the Houston Oilers).

Henderson, characterized by his drum and gravelly voice, in 1980 gained widespread attention, including that of NFL Commissioner Pete Rozelle. After the Pittsburgh Steelers Coach Chuck Noll complained about the crowd noise generated in a game against Houston, the Minnesota Vikings contacted the Houston Oilers to "make sure I was controlled and would not do anything to hinder their plays." After losing the game, the Vikings lodged an objection claiming the cheering inspired by George disrupted the signal calling of the Minnesota quarterback. The Viking's general manager, Mike Lynn, later said that Vikings quarterback Tommy Kramer could not be heard above the crowd noise as the Vikings lost 21–16. Lynn eventually hired Henderson in 1982 to work for the Vikings.

In 1989 the NFL adopted a rule specifically targeting "noise making specialists hired exclusively for that purpose" of disrupting play calling, a rule that Henderson says was aimed at him.

His professional career included leading cheers for the United States men's national soccer team at the 1994 FIFA World Cup international soccer championship tournament being hosted by the United States. He appeared at USA games in Stanford Stadium and the Rose Bowl stadium in Pasadena, California. He has worked for numerous minor league sports teams, has been a motivational "speaker" for corporations, and appeared at rallies for political candidates. As of 2022 he was still appearing at San Jose Earthquakes games in San Jose.

The Wave
Henderson is the inventor of the Wave.  The first documented use of the Wave was during his cheerleading routine on October 15, 1981, while at a nationally televised Oakland Athletics American League Championship Series game against the New York Yankees. Henderson says that the Wave was originally inspired by accident when he was leading cheers at a Colorado Rockies National Hockey League game at McNichols Sports Arena in Denver, Colorado in 1980. He continued working on leading the Wave at an NHL game at Northlands Coliseum in Edmonton, Alberta, Canada the same year, where Edmonton Oilers star Wayne Gretzky met George in the post-game locker room and invited Henderson to dinner.

At the Colorado Rockies game in late 1980, there was a delayed response from one section of fans, leading to them jumping to their feet a few seconds later than the section beside them.  The next section of fans followed suit, and the first Wave circled McNichols Sports Arena of its own accord. The A's/Yankees game combined a full stadium with an energetic crowd, the ideal situation for a Wave.  After a few false starts, the crowd understood what Henderson was trying to accomplish, and the Wave circled the Oakland Coliseum, followed by several others during the game.

Employers
 
During his career, Henderson has worked for a number of teams in many different sports, including:

Ball State Cardinals (NCAA)
British Columbia Lions (CFL)
California Golden Seals (NHL)
Colorado Avalanche (NHL)
Colorado Rockies (MLB)
Colorado Rockies (NHL)
Dallas Tornado (NASL)
Edmonton Drillers (NASL)
Edmonton Oilers (NHL)
Houston Hotshots (CISL & WISL)
Houston Oilers (NFL)
Houston Stallions (Southern Indoor Football League)
Kansas City Chiefs (NFL)
Minnesota Vikings (NFL)
New Orleans Saints (NFL)
Oakland Athletics (MLB)
Oklahoma State Cowboys (NCAA)
Pittsburgh Spirit (MISL)
Salt Lake Sting (APSL)
San Jose Earthquakes (MLS and NASL)
San Jose Giants (California League)
San Jose State Spartans (NCAA)
Tampa Bay Rowdies (NASL)
Tennessee Titans (NFL)
Tulsa Roughnecks (NASL)
The United States men's and women's national soccer teams at the FIFA World Cup and the Olympics
Vancouver Giants (WHL)
Vancouver Whitecaps (NASL)
Wheeling Nailers (ECHL)
Wichita Wings (MISL)
Winnipeg Jets (NHL)

In media
George appeared in an episode of the Match Game-Hollywood Squares Hour, hired by panelist Robert Donner to improve his rapport with the audience. He was also a contestant in an episode of To Tell the Truth.

He played a small role in the 1977 cult film "The Milpitas Monster."

He was featured in a tenth-season episode of America's Got Talent, during which his entire act consisted solely of leading the audience in "the wave". He was buzzed out by the judges in seconds.

Personal life
George and his wife Pat live in Capitola in Northern California.

References

External links

 Minor League Baseball
 Official website
 : San Jose Mercury News profile on the 25th anniversary of The Wave

1944 births
Living people
American cheerleaders
National Football League cheerleaders
People from San Jose, California
San Jose State University alumni
Sports in the San Francisco Bay Area
Oakland Athletics
American male judoka